Sacred Heart University Luxembourg (SHULU) offers graduate level business programs in Luxembourg (Luxembourg City) tailored to the needs of working professionals. SHU Luxembourg is the European branch of Sacred Heart University, which educates business students in Fairfield, Connecticut (CT). The University was abruptly closed in early 2022.

Academics 
Program specializations include a full-time MBA program with internship, where students receive real-world experience at domestic and international companies in Luxembourg. The paid internships last between 6 and 9 months and come with career coaching and job placement assistance. Their part-time Executive MBA can be completed at the student’s pace, typically lasting about 2 years.  

They also offer graduate certificates in Private Equity, Corporate Finance, Digital Management (Blockchain & Big Data, Artificial Intelligence, and Digital Transformation). 

SHULU’s programs are delivered at the Chamber of Commerce in Kirchberg, in the heart of the financial sector and European institutions. All classes take place on the weekdays between 6:30 and 9:30 pm, in order to adapt to the work and family lives of students.

History 
In 1991, Henri Ahlborn, then director of the Chamber of Commerce, reached out to universities in the United States in order to find a partner institution. As a result, Sacred Heart University has been offering an internationally accredited MBA program, the first of its kind in Luxembourg. In the last 30 years, SHULU has graduated 700 business students representing more than 50 different countries. Scared Heart University close it doors in Luxembourg to all students and staff in July 2022.

Accreditation and rankings

 SHULU is accredited by the AACSB International, an elite membership of fewer than five (5%) percent of business schools worldwide.
 It has earned the Grand Ducal Decree which provides recognition of SHULU diplomas with the Luxembourg Ministry of Higher Education and Research.
 Sacred Heart University is listed as a recognized university by the Chinese Ministry of Education.
 Sacred Heart University has been named one of the Best Business Schools for Part-Time MBA by Bloomberg Business week and by U.S. News & World Report
 Sacred Heart University Jack Welch College of Business & Technology has been named one of the best business schools by the Princeton Review
 Sacred Heart University has been named fourth most innovative schools in the North by the U.S. News & World Report.
 The university has been upgraded to an A3 Moody business rating.

Board of regents  
 Charles-Louis Ackermann, President of Accumalux Group and Poudrerie de Luxembourg
 Julie Becker, Deputy CEO of Luxembourg Stock Exchange
 Aïssata Coulibaly, Associate Partner, EY Luxembourg
 Melanie Delannoy, Marketing, Communications and PR Advisor specialized in the ICT, Space and Startup industry. Director of Paperjam + Delano Club.
 Martin Dobbins, CEO and Founder of Sage Advisory s.á.r.l.
 Shiva Dustdar,Head of the Innovation Finance Advisory (IFA) Division, European Investment Bank (EIB)
 Jean Ehret, Director of Centre Jean XXII - Grand Séminaire
 Jacques Lanners, Independent Administrator
 Raymond Schadeck, Chair of Board of Regents, Sacred Heart University Luxembourg
 Katia Scheidecker, Independent Lawyer
 Karin Schintgen, Founder and CEO of House of Start-Ups
 Rolf Tarrach, Rector emeritus at University of Luxembourg
 Marc Wagener, COO, Director Training, Chamber of Commerce of Luxembourg

References

External links
 Sacred Heart University Luxembourg official website
 Sacred Heart University, Fairfield, Connecticut

Universities and colleges in Luxembourg
Sacred Heart University
Education in Luxembourg City
Business schools in Luxembourg
Educational institutions in Luxembourg
1991 establishments in Luxembourg
Educational institutions established in 1991